Powers Hotel may refer to:

Powers Hotel (Fargo, North Dakota), listed on the National Register of Historic Places (NRHP)
Powers Hotel (Powers, Oregon), formerly listed on the NRHP in Coos County, Oregon

See also
Powers House (disambiguation)